Pleurobema verum, the true pigtoe, was a species of freshwater mussel, an aquatic bivalve mollusk in the family Unionidae, the river mussels.

This species was endemic to the United States.

References

verum
Bivalves described in 1861
Taxonomy articles created by Polbot